Marchlyn Mawr reservoir is a high level lake in Snowdonia behind Elidir Fawr mountain. It is used as the high level water source for Dinorwig power station, a closed-loop pumped storage hydroelectric generating facility.

It is said that nearby lies the cave containing Arthur's treasure, a source of bedazzlement to the wanderer who sees it, and of disaster to the pilferer who touches it. The lake itself lies in between two mountains Carnedd y Fillast and Elidir Fawr and lies at a height of 636m above sea level and the reservoir took four years to build (from 1975 to 1979).

It is possible to cycle up the road to the reservoir but a gate at the bottom prevents cars from driving on the road.

References

External links 
www.geograph.co.uk : photos of Marchlyn Mawr and surrounding area
Timeline

Llanddeiniolen
Reservoirs in Gwynedd
Reservoirs in Snowdonia